Uttar Pradesh Control of Organised Crimes Act, 2017 (UPCOCA) is a law enacted by Uttar Pradesh state in India in 2017 to combat organized crime and terrorism.

References

2017 in law
Counterterrorism in India
Organised crime in India
Crime in Uttar Pradesh
Law enforcement in Uttar Pradesh
2017 in India
Acts related to organized crime
Uttar Pradesh state legislation
Indian criminal law